The India Rubber, Gutta Percha and Telegraph Works Company was a London-based company based in Silvertown, East London. It was founded by Stephen William Silver in March 1864 as Silver's Indiarubber Works and Telegraph Cable Company Ltd. However in July that year the name was changed to the India Rubber, Gutta Percha and Telegraph Works Company.

Origins
S.W. Silver & Company had been doing business since the 18th century supplying colonial and army needs for clothing and acting as shipping agents for personnel traveling overseas. After Charles Macintosh developed waterproofing for fabric the company set up a factory at Greenwich for manufacture of such goods. After that factory began manufacture of insulated wire and cable the factory was moved across the Thames to North Woolwich and continued to expand with much of the local population employed in the works and the area becoming known as Silvertown. Before becoming a limited company the manufacture of cable had been restricted to relatively short segments of the cable and core (the conductor and inner insulation). Silver's sons, Stephen William Silver and Hugh Adams Silver took over and expanded the business and began more work with submarine cable insulation becoming in 1863 Silver’s India Rubber Works & Telegraph Cable Company, Limited.

In 1864 Charles Hancock merged his West Ham Gutta Percha Company into Silver's company to form the India Rubber, Gutta Percha and Telegraph Works Company. Charles Hancock, a younger brother of Thomas Hancock, had been a founder of the Gutta Percha Company, but after a dispute with his partner he left to set up the rival West Ham Gutta Percha Company in 1850 with the support of his family. With Hancock's patents and experience in submarine cable manufacture the new company entered fully into the submarine cable manufacturing business while maintaining a profitable business ranging from making rubber bands to waterproof coats.

Submarine cable
The company entered the business of laying as well as manufacturing cables for other companies engaged in cable laying. In 1865 the company manufactured and laid its first cable for the Submarine Telegraph Company from Dover to Cap Gris Nez. In 1867 it manufactured and laid a cable linking Key West with Havana and Punta Rassa for the Florida based International Ocean Telegraph Company. The relationship with that Florida company resulted in cooperative founding of three new system operation companies, the West India and Panama Telegraph Company, the Cuba Submarine Telegraph Company and the Panama and South Pacific Telegraph Company. They made two zig-zag sounding lines  gathering 552 soundings.

After 1902 the company largely withdrew from cable manufacture but continued installing submarine cable until 1914 when only one cable ship, Dacia remained. Dacia was torpedoed 3 December 1916 by U-38 off Funchal, Madeira while diverting the German South American cable into Brest. U-38 sunk two other ships in this action and shelled Funchal with the British cable station as a primary target. The ship had previously repaired French cables and diverted German-African cables. The company withdrew from submarine cable work until 1922. Another ship, renamed , was acquired and modified for cable work that continued several years until that ship was sold to the Medway Steam Packet Company and the company's submarine cable work ceased.

Cable ships

Dacia and International were joined by two more ships as the cable laying business grew. , built by Hooper's Telegraph Works as the second specifically designed cable ship and first ship designed for transatlantic cable laying was second in size only to Great Eastern when built in  1873. Hooper was acquired in 1881 and renamed Silvertown.  was built for the company as tender to Silvertown with two cable tanks but no cable laying machinery until a later refit when that machinery and bow sheaves were fitted. The last cable ship, replacing the torpedoed Dacia, was Silvergray purchased in 1922 which was in operation only a few years as a cable ship.

Other business
During the 1880s some of the first Bell’s patent telephones were manufactured at the Silvertown plant. The company by the 1890s was a supplier of electric generating plants to cities and towns both in the United Kingdom and on the Continent. Bicycle and later automobile tires were a major business segment in later years. By 1927 the company was in financial difficulty until the British Goodrich Rubber Company, itself a subsidiary of the B.F. Goodrich Company, acquired a controlling interest in 1933 and a year later the company's name was changed to British Tyre & Rubber Company.

Footnotes

References

External links
 Science Museum Group (London) corporation history summary, objects in collection
 University of Pennsylvania, The Online Books Page, Subject: The India Rubber, Gutta Percha, and Telegraph Works Company, Limited
 National Maritime Museum, Greenwich, London, Daniel Bolt Collection, house flag image
 South American Cables 1891-1892 Example of detailed description of the cable and cable lay.
 Photographs sinking of CS Dacia

Rubber industry
Telecommunications companies established in 1864
Cable manufacture in London
Submarine communications cables
Defunct telecommunications companies of the United Kingdom
Telegraph companies of the United Kingdom
1864 establishments in England
British companies established in 1864
Companies based in the London Borough of Newham